Vorderschmiding is a village in the district of Freyung-Grafenau in Bavaria in Germany. It is part of the municipality of Hinterschmiding

Freyung-Grafenau